Ella Ensink (1897–1968) was a German film editor. She frequently worked with the Czech director Carl Lamac.

Selected filmography
 The Cruel Mistress (1932)
 A Night in Paradise (1932)
 Should We Wed Them? (1932)
 The Ringer (1932)
 Scampolo (1932)
 The Love Hotel (1933)
 Madame Wants No Children (1933)
 Little Dorrit (1934)
 Polish Blood (1934)
 The Switched Bride (1934)
 The Double (1934)
 Peer Gynt (1934)
 The Young Count (1935)
 Knockout (1935)
 A Girl from the Chorus (1937)
 The Hound of the Baskervilles (1937) 
 The Stars Shine (1938)
 The Merciful Lie (1939)
 Robert and Bertram (1939)
 The Vulture Wally (1940)
 My Daughter Doesn't Do That (1940)
 The Degenhardts (1944)
 Anna Alt (1945)
 The Song of the Rivers (1954)

References

Bibliography
 Giesen, Rolf. Nazi Propaganda Films: A History and Filmography. McFarland, 2003.

External links

1897 births
1968 deaths
German film editors
Film people from Berlin
German women film editors